Monroe Township is a township in Daviess County, in the U.S. state of Missouri.

The township is named after President James Monroe.

References

Townships in Missouri
Townships in Daviess County, Missouri